Mary Magdalene is a c.1535-1540 oil on canvas painting by Giovanni Girolamo Savoldo, now in the National Gallery, London, which acquired it in 1978.

It is generally considered to be the first of a series of four paintings of the subject, which was popular among private Venetian commissioners. The other three are in the:
 Contini Bonacossi collection in Florence - with a rocky outcrop added in the background, this copy was acquired by Bonacossi from the Giovannelli collection in Venice in 1935;
 Getty Museum in Los Angeles - with a gold mantle unlike the grey one in other versions, this copy was previously in Warwick Castle.
 Gemäldegalerie in Berlin - without the vase but signed

References

1540 paintings
Paintings by Girolamo Savoldo
Paintings depicting Mary Magdalene
Collections of the National Gallery, London